Royal College Wayamba, Kurunegala (also known as Wayamba Royal College) is a national school in Kurunegala, Established in February 1993Sri Lanka. Current students of the school are known as Wayamba Royalists

College Facilities
Royal College Wayamba, Kurunegala has a number of facilities, including computer laboratories, lecture halls, science laboratories, playground and auditorium.

Annual Big Match

The annual cricket Big Match, known as the Battle Of The Greens, is played between the school and Sir John Kotalawala College.

See also
 List of schools in North Western Province, Sri Lanka

References

External links
 

 
Educational institutions established in 1993
National schools in Sri Lanka
Schools in Kurunegala
1993 establishments in Sri Lanka